Lynge-Frederiksborg Herred (Lynge-Frederiksborg Herred Hundred) was an administrative division in Frederiksborg County in the northern part of the island of  Zealand, Denmark. It was created when Lynge Herred was divided into Lynge-Kronborg Herred and Lynge-Frederiksborg Herred in 1862, and disappeared with the adoption of the Administration of Justice Act (Retsplejeloven) in 1919. The only market town in Lynge-Kronborg Herred was Helsingør.

Parishes
The following present-day parishes are located in the former Lynge-KronborgHerred:
 Asminderød Parish
 Birkerød Parish
 Bistrup Parish
 Blovstrød Parish
 Egebæksvang Parish
 Grønholt Parish
 Gurre Parish
 Hellebæk Parish
 Hornbæk Parish
 Humlebæk Parish
 Hørsholm Parish
 Karlebo Parish
 Kokkedal Parish (not shown on the map)
 Mørdrup Parish (not shown on the map)
 Tungsted Parish (not shown on the map)
 St Mary's Parish (not shown on the map)
 St Olai's Parish (not shown on the map)
 Sthens Sogn (Ej vist på kort)
 Tikøb Parish
 Vestervang Parish (Ej vist på kort)

See also
 Hundreds of Denmark

References

External links

Hundreds of Denmark
1862 establishments in Denmark
Allerød Municipality
Fredensborg Municipality
Helsingør Municipality
Hørsholm Municipality